Brenthia trilampas is a species of moth of the family Choreutidae. It was described by Edward Meyrick in 1918. It is found in the Philippines.

References

Brenthia
Moths described in 1918